Team Queen is a music video for Triple Creme directed by Leah Meyerhoff.

A Planet Out Award finalist, Team Queen is a gender-bending, fire-breathing, tassel-twirling music video for the queer post-punk band Triple Creme starring the best of New York burlesque. Team Queen has screened at dozens of film festivals worldwide and is currently airing on LOGO.

Synopsis
The new girl in school is thrown into a topsy-turvy madhouse of high school hellcats. The cheerleaders are drag queens, the nerds are nymphomaniacs, the punks breathe fire, and the prom band is none other than queer post-punk phenomenon Triple Creme. Featuring the best of New York burlesque: including Murray Hill, Julie Atlas Muz, Tigger, and Scotty the Blue Bunny.

Cast
Murray Hill — Principal
Molly the Dolly — Prom Queen
Julie Atlas Muz — Burlesque Dancer
Tigger — Burlesque Dancer
Scarlet Sinclair — Burlesque Dancer
Scotty the Blue Bunny — Burlesque Dancer

Awards
Planet Out Awards — Finalist
Fort Worth LGBT Film Festival — Best Music Video
Out Music Awards — Best Music Video Nominee
San Diego Women Film Festival — Judge's Award
Pill Awards — Best Music Video Nominee
Gaffers Film Festival — Best Music Video
Rebel Film Festival — Best Music Video
Micro Cine Fest — Best Music Video
Evil City Film Fest — Best Music Video

Festivals

Antimatter Underground Film Festival
Austin LGBT Film Festival
Austin Underground Film Festival
Backseat Film Festival
Boston Underground Film Festival
Boxurshorts Film Festival
Brighton Film Festival
Brooklyn Cinema Series
Charm City Kitty Club
Cinejam
Coney Island Film Festival
Copenhagen Gay & Lesbian Film Festival
Cucalorus Film Festival
Ellensburg Film Festival
End of the Pier Film Festival
Evil City Film Festival
First Run Film Festival
Flix & Mix Film Festival
Fort Worth Gay & Lesbian Film Festival
Frameline Film Festival
Fresh Fruit Film Festival
Fylmz Festival
Gaffers Film Festival
Great Lakes Film Festival
Homoagogo
Indie Music Video Festival
Inside Out Film and Video Festival
Lake County Film Festival
Lost Film Fest
Miami Gay & Lesbian Film Festival
Micro Cine Fest
Milan Gay & Lesbian Film Festival
MondoHomo

MIX Film Festival
New England Women in Film and Video
NewFest
No Festival Required
NXNE
Ohio Independent Film Festival
Outfest
Out Takes Dallas
Oxford Film Festival
Planet Ant Film Festival
Portland Gay & Lesbian Film Festival
Portland Underground Film Festival
Pride Film Festival
Q Cinema
Queens International Film Festival
Queeruption
Queer Quickie Film Festival
Rebel Film Festival
Reeling Film Festival
Rome International Film Festival
Route 66 Film Festival
San Antonio Underground Film Festival
San Diego Women Film Festival
San Francisco Women's Film Festival
Santa Cruz Film Festival
Sarasota Film Festival
Silver Lake Shorts
Teabag Film Workshop
Tiburon International Film Festival
Toofy Film Festival
Trenton Film Festival
Waterfront Film Festival
Wichita Film Festival

Reviews
Paper magazine writes "They’re here, they’re queer, and they’re ready to rock. The grrrls in the post-punk Brooklyn band Triple-Crème are not afraid of a little heavy bass or some catchy guitar riffs. They’re also not afraid to kick your ass." Christa Martin of GT Weekly says "This colorful romp in high school antics and edginess is a wild ride of a music video."

Elaine Mak of New England Film said that "award-winning director Leah Meyerhoff has built up a large list of accomplishments as a filmmaker" and Flavorpill writes: "post-punk lez rockers Triple Creme enlisted the brightest and most buoyant of New York's burlesque scene to star in the new music video for their single Team Queen."

References

External links
Team Queen official site
Triple Creme official site

2000s music videos
Queercore films
LGBT-related songs
American LGBT-related films
Punk films
2000s English-language films
2000s American films